Menkib can refer to the following stars (the name derives from the Arabic منكب mankib, meaning "shoulder"):

 Menkib, the proper name approved by the International Astronomical Union for the star Xi Persei, in the constellation of Perseus. (It was previously also spelt Menchib or Menkhib.) 
 Mankib, traditional name for the star Beta Pegasi in the constellation of Pegasus.
 Menkab, traditional name for the star Alpha Orionis or Betelgeuse in the constellation of Orion
 Markab, the proper name approved by the International Astronomical Union for the star (Alpha Pegasi), in the constellation of Pegasus.